Paul Fuapapa Soliai (born December 30, 1983) is a former American football defensive tackle. He played college football at University of Utah. He was drafted by the Miami Dolphins in the fourth round of the 2007 NFL Draft. He has also played for the Atlanta Falcons and the Carolina Panthers.

High school career
Soliai, of Samoan descent, attended Rancho Alamitos High School in Garden Grove before moving to American Samoa for his senior year, he attended Nu'uuli Technical High School in Pago Pago, American Samoa where he was team captain as a senior.

College career

Junior college
Soliai spend two seasons at Coffeyville Community College in Coffeyville, Kansas. He was a two-time All-Kansas Jayhawk Community College Conference offensive lineman. He earned an honorable mention All-American selection in 2002, and was a First-team junior college All-American as a sophomore in 2003.

Considered a four-star recruit out of junior college by Rivals.com, Soliai was listed as the No. 32 non-high school player in the nation.

Utah
Soliai transferred to the University of Utah in 2004 and was redshirted his first season. He played in 12 games as a junior in 2005, with up five tackles, 1.5 of which were for a loss. He made four stops against rival Utah State, including an assisted tackle for a loss. He also had a 10-yard sack against Arizona.

In 12 games at nose guard as a senior in 2006, Soliai recorded 35 tackles (13 solo), 3.5 tackles for a loss, two sacks for 15 yards, four pass break-ups, a forced fumble, a fumble recovery and a blocked kick. He earned a Second-team All-Mountain West Conference selection.

Professional career

2007 NFL Draft
In April 2007, Soliai measured a height of 6-feet-4 and a weight of 332 pounds at his Utah Pro Day. He ran the 40-yard dash in 5.02seconds and 5.12 seconds, the short shuttle in 4.53 seconds and the three-cone drill in 7.77 seconds. He measured a 30½-inch vertical jump, but an elbow sprain prevented him from doing the 225-pound bench press.

Prior to the draft, Soliai was praised for his rare size, strength, quickness and athleticism, while also being criticized for his lack of technique and moves.

Miami Dolphins
Soliai was drafted by the Miami Dolphins in the fourth round (108th overall) of the 2007 NFL Draft, signing a four-year contract on June 7.

Before the NFL lockout, Soliai was franchise tagged by the Dolphins. They gave him a one-year guaranteed salary of at least $12 million, which was the average of the top 5 salaries at that position. This was made bloated by Albert Haynesworth's record-breaking $100 million contract from the Redskins.

On January 24, 2012, Soliai was added to the AFC Pro Bowl Roster to replace Ravens defensive tackle Haloti Ngata.

On March 14, 2012, Soliai signed a 2-year extension with Miami worth $12 million, with $6 million guaranteed for the 2012 and 2013 seasons.

Atlanta Falcons

On March 11, 2014, Soliai agreed to terms with the Atlanta Falcons on a five-year, $33 million contract including $14 million guaranteed. In a week 8 game against the Detroit Lions at Wembley Stadium in London, Soliai was called for a holding penalty against Lions center Dominic Raiola. This penalty set up kicker Matt Prater for a game-winning 47 yard field goal, which he made, handing the Falcons a 22-21 loss and dropping them to a 2-5 record. On December 29, 2015 Soliai was placed on injured reserve ending his season.

On March 9, 2016, the Atlanta Falcons cut Soliai.

Carolina Panthers
Soliai signed with the Carolina Panthers on March 14, 2016.

On February 21, 2017, Soliai was released by the Panthers.

Retirement
On April 19, 2018, Soliai signed a one-day contract to retire as a member of the Dolphins.

References

External links

Carolina Panthers bio
Atlanta Falcons bio
Miami Dolphins bio
Utah Utes bio

1983 births
American Conference Pro Bowl players
American football defensive tackles
American sportspeople of Samoan descent
People from Pago Pago
Atlanta Falcons players
Carolina Panthers players
Coffeyville Red Ravens football players
Living people
Miami Dolphins players
Players of American football from California
Sportspeople from Santa Ana, California
Utah Utes football players
Players of American football from American Samoa
Ed Block Courage Award recipients